Haploclathra is a plant genus in the family Calophyllaceae. It includes species native to the Amazon basin of Brazil and Peru.

References

Calophyllaceae
Malpighiales genera